The Cox–Zucker machine is an algorithm created by David A. Cox and Steven Zucker. This algorithm determines whether a given set of sections provides a basis (up to torsion) for the Mordell–Weil group of an elliptic surface E → S, where S is isomorphic to the projective line.

The algorithm was first published in the 1979 article "Intersection numbers of sections of elliptic surfaces" by Cox and Zucker and was later named the "Cox–Zucker machine" by Charles Schwartz in 1984.

Origin of name

The name sounds similar to the obscenity "". This was a deliberate choice by Cox and Zucker, who conceived of the idea of coauthoring a paper in 1970, while first-year graduate students at Princeton University, for the express purpose of enabling this joke. They followed through on it five years later, as members of the faculty at Rutgers, the State University of New Jersey. 
As Cox explained in a memorial tribute to Zucker in Notices of the American Mathematical Society in 2021: "A few weeks after we met, we realized that we had to write a joint paper because the combination of our last names, in the usual alphabetical order, is remarkably obscene."

References 

Complex manifolds
Birational geometry
Algebraic surfaces
Mathematical humor